Lake Sulunga, also known as Bahi Swamp, is a shallow seasonal lake on the border of the Dodoma and Singida regions In Tanzania. It is the largest body of water for both regions during the wet season. 

It is located about 45 km west of the capital Dodoma in an endorheic basin known as the Bahi depression. Its main tributaries are the Bubu and the Mponde.

The lake is surrounded by a variety of settlements and plays an important role in local fishing and animal husbandry.

The lake is in danger of being severely affected by mining in the future, as the area is evidently home to uranium, gold and probably diamonds.

References

Sulunga